Kashif Iqbal (born 14 May 1997) is a Pakistani cricketer. He made his first-class debut for Karachi Whites in the 2018–19 Quaid-e-Azam Trophy on 1 September 2018. He made his List A debut for Karachi Whites in the 2018–19 Quaid-e-Azam One Day Cup on 6 September 2018.

References

External links
 

1997 births
Living people
Pakistani cricketers
Karachi Whites cricketers
Place of birth missing (living people)